Pukara (Quechua for fortress) is an archaeological site in the Ayacucho Region in Peru. It is located in the Víctor Fajardo Province, Sarhua District.

References

Archaeological sites in Ayacucho Region
Archaeological sites in Peru